Oliver Jandrić (Serbian Cyrillic: Оливер Јандрић, born 21 December 1974) is a Bosnian-Herzegovinian football manager and former player.

Playing career

Club
Jandrić spent 14 years at hometown club Borac Banja Luka in addition to a season in Austria and Slovenia.

Managerial career
He reached an agreement with Borac' president Srdjan Šuput after they were in dispute over outstanding payment to the former coach. In September 2016 he was appointed the new sports director at Borac Banja Luka, the club where he spent most of his playing days and was club captain for several years.

References

1974 births
Living people
Sportspeople from Banja Luka
Association football midfielders
Bosnia and Herzegovina footballers
Wolfsberger AC players
NK Ljubljana players
FK Borac Banja Luka players
Slovenian PrvaLiga players
Premier League of Bosnia and Herzegovina players
First League of the Republika Srpska players
Bosnia and Herzegovina expatriate footballers
Expatriate footballers in Austria
Bosnia and Herzegovina expatriate sportspeople in Austria
Expatriate footballers in Slovenia
Bosnia and Herzegovina expatriate sportspeople in Slovenia